The 1979 season was the Los Angeles Rams' 42nd season in the National Football League (NFL), their 43rd overall, and their 34th in the Greater Los Angeles Area. It was the final season for the franchise in the Los Angeles Memorial Coliseum until 2016, as late owner Carroll Rosenbloom previously announced the Rams would move to Anaheim Stadium for the 1980 season.

The Rams won their seventh-consecutive NFC West title in 1979, and went to the Super Bowl for the first time. It was the team's only Super Bowl appearance during their first stint in Los Angeles, and their first appearance in a league championship game since 1955. It would be the Rams' last division title for six seasons and the last time they would win consecutive division titles until 2017-18. The Rams wouldn't return to the Super Bowl based in Los Angeles until 2018 (their next one as a franchise was in 1999 while based in St. Louis).

The 1979 Rams were the first team in NFL history to have a less than a +50 point differential and make it to the Super Bowl. (The Rams scored only 14 points more than their opponents in 1979.) Thirty-two years later, the 2011 New York Giants, also with a 9–7 record, became the first team to reach the Super Bowl with a negative point differential (−6); unlike the 1979 Rams, the Giants would go on to win the Super Bowl, defeating the New England Patriots in Super Bowl XLVI. The 2008 Arizona Cardinals also reached the Super Bowl, but lost in the final moments of Super Bowl XLIII, also to the Pittsburgh Steelers.

Offseason 
Owner Caroll Rosenbloom drowned on April 2, 1979, while swimming in the Atlantic Ocean just off of his home in Golden Beach, Florida, leaving the team to his widow, Georgia.

Draft

Final roster

Preseason

Schedule

Notes:

 All times are PACIFIC time.

Regular season

Schedule 

Notes:

 All times are PACIFIC time. (UTC–7 and UTC–8 starting October 28)

Season summary

Week 1 

The Rams jumped out to an early 14–0 lead, but a failure to protect the punter led to two blocks and 10 Raider points before halftime. Raiders also intercepted three second-half passes and turned two into Ken Stabler to Raymond Chester touchdown passes.

Week 2 

This game feature a rare safety scored when Rams tackle John Williams held Bronco LB Larry Evans in the end zone in the 1st. Rams appeared on verge of going 0–2 until, late in the 4th, safety Dave Elmendorf laid a hit on QB Craig Morton and LB Jack Reynolds picked up the fumble and bulled into the end zone for the winning score.

Week 3 

After spotting the 49ers 10 points, the Rams scored 24 unanswered, Pat Haden passing for two touchdowns and Cullen Bryant rushing for 106 yards and another to secure the win.

Week 4 

Jim Youngblood put the Rams on the board early with an interception return touchdown, but from then on it was all Buccaneers as Doug Williams tossed 2 touchdowns in the second quarter and the vaunted Bucs defense shut down the Rams.

Week 5 

Rams bounced back with a shutout. Wendell Tyler started for more speed in the Rams' backfield and scored a touchdown.

Week 6 

Haden threw for 3 touchdowns in the blowout, but WR Ron Jessie would be lost for the remainder of the season, along with fellow WR Willie Miller

Week 7 

In a dominating performance by the Cowboys, Roger Staubach passed for 3 touchdowns and Tony Dorsett ran for 103 and another.

Week 8 

The Chargers, normally known for a high-powered offense, forced eight turnovers, including 4 INT's and 4 fumble recoveries (one for a touchdown). They also had five sacks and numerous hits on QB Haden. Dan Fouts passed for 326 yards and two touchdowns.

Week 9 

Haden passed for 282 yards and two touchdowns, but also threw 4 more INT's and had trouble making big plays. Giants rookie QB Phil Simms made plenty both running and passing.

Week 10 

Rams defense turned in a record-setting performance, holding the Seahawks to minus-7 yards of total offense and one first down. Haden threw two touchdowns on 21-of-24 passing and set a team record with 13 straight completions, but fractured his right pinky finger in the Kingdome's AstroTurf and would be lost for the rest of the season.

Week 11 

With both Haden and backup Vince Ferragamo out, the Rams turned to Jeff Rutledge. Rutledge played it close to the vest, threw for a touchdown, and led the Rams to a 23–14 lead after 3, but the defense couldn't hold off a comeback.

Week 12 

Ferragamo made his first start of the season in this Monday night game and immediately showed his "big-play" capability, completing long touchdown passes to young speedsters Preston Dennard and Billy Waddy.

Week 13 

An unexpected tough game against the 1–11 49ers that featured many big plays, including an 80-yard blocked field goal return touchdown by Ram CB Sid Justin and a 71-yd. touchdown pass from Ferragamo to Tyler.

Week 14 

Rams lined up for a potential game-winning field goal in overtime, but holder Nolan Cromwell scored on a 5-yard touchdown run to lift the Rams into first place in the NFC West. The Rams took sole possession of the division lead the next night when the Raiders rallied from a 35–14 deficit in New Orleans to defeat the Saints 42–35.

Week 15 

In this impressive road game, the Rams clinched their seventh straight NFC West division title. Ferragamo was entrenched as the Rams' quarterback by this time, and would go on to an impressive postseason.

Week 16 

Tyler rushed for 141 yards and a first-quarter touchdown, but New Orleans scored the next 27 points to win going away in the Rams' final home game at the Coliseum before their relocation to Anaheim Stadium. The victory allowed the Saints to finish 8–8, the franchise's first non-losing record after 12 consecutive losing seasons. This would mark the final game the Los Angeles Rams would play at home with the Los Angeles Memorial Coliseum as their permanent venue. The Rams would subsequently play more games between 2016 and 2019 with their relocation back to Los Angeles, playing their first home playoff game at the venue since 1978 in 2017.

Standings

Playoffs 

Notes:

 All times are PACIFIC time.

NFC Divisional Playoffs (Sunday, December 30, 1979): at (1) Dallas Cowboys

Quarterback Vince Ferragamo led the Rams to a victory by throwing for 3 touchdown passes, the last one with 2:06 left in the game. The Cowboys scored first when defensive tackle Randy White sacked Ferragamo in the end zone for a safety. However, Ferragamo responded by throwing a 32-yard touchdown pass to running back Wendell Tyler. Dallas kicker Rafael Septién kicked a 33-yard field goal with 52 seconds left in the first half, but Ferragamo completed a 43-yard touchdown pass to Ron Smith before time expired to make it a 14–5 halftime lead. The Cowboys, led by quarterback Roger Staubach in what proved to be his last NFL game of his Hall of Fame career, then scored 2 unanswered touchdowns in the second half to take the lead, 19–14. With about 2 minutes left in the game and the Rams at midfield, Ferragamo found wide receiver Billy Waddy on a short crossing route and Waddy sprinted the rest of the way for a game winning 50-yard touchdown. Staubach was unable to engineer a late fourth quarter comeback like the ones that made him famous throughout his career. The Rams defense pressured the Dallas quarterback to throw a pass illegally to an ineligible receiver, guard Herbert Scott, on third down, the last pass of his career to be caught; on fourth down, he overthrew Drew Pearson.

Conference Championship 

In a defensive battle in which the Rams squandered numerous scoring opportunities, Rams kicker Frank Corral kicked 3 field goals to win the game. Los Angeles was able to record 369 yards of total offense, while running backs Cullen Bryant and Wendell Tyler rushed for 106 and 86 yards, respectively. Meanwhile, the Buccaneers only had 177 total offensive yards, including 92 rushing yards and 85 passing yards. Most of Tampa Bay's passing yards came from a 42-yard halfback option pass from Jerry Eckwood to wide receiver Larry Mucker in the fourth quarter. During the game, two touchdowns were nullified by penalties, one by each team: A four-yard run by Bryant and a 27-yard reception by Buccaneers' tight end Jimmie Giles.

Super Bowl

References 

Los Angeles Rams
Los Angeles Rams seasons
NFC West championship seasons
National Football Conference championship seasons
Los Angeles Rams